The 2003 Summer Universiade, also known as the XXII Summer Universiade, took place in Daegu, South Korea.

Emblem
 The alphabet letter "U" and five stars, which is FISU's emblem, make up the basis of the emblem for the Daegu Universiade.
 It symbolizes the theme of "Dream for Unity" and the five goals (Dream, Advance, Equalize, Green and Unite) of the Games.
 The wide green stripe emphasizing Daegu's image as an environmentally friendly city.
 The Five-colored stripes symbolize Daegu as a city of textile and fashion.
 The soaring figure of the Universiade's five stars and five stripes in harmony symbolize the challenging spirit of youth across the globe, Daegu's upright spirit and vision for the bright future.

Mascot
 The mascot embodies the Image of Daegu Summer Universiade, a festival of the University Students on the global village.
 The rainbow colors symbolize the textile & fashion industry, environmentally friendly city and the dreams toward unity transcending all the barriers or differences.
 Cyber-typed Mascot represents the creativity and challenging spirit toward the future of the youth.

Venues

Daegu
Suseong
 Daegu Stadium — ceremonies, athletics, football
 Daegu Athletics Park Swimming Pool — water polo
 Daegu Athletics Arena — gymnastics
 Kyeongbuk High School Gymnasium — taekwondo
 Junghwa Girls' High School Gymnasium — basketball
 Suseong District Stadium — football
Buk
 Daegu Municipal Stadium — football
 Daegu Baseball Stadium — archery
 Daegu Citizens' Gymnasium — basketball
 Daegu Gymnasium — volleyball
 Daegu Il Middle School Gymnasium — volleyball
 Riverside Football Ground — football
 Daegu Expo Hall 1 — fencing
Dalseo
 Daegu Universiade Tennis Center — tennis
 Duryu Swimming Pool — swimming, diving
 Duryu Arena — judo
 Yeungnam High School Gymnasium — basketball
Nam
 Yeungnam College of Science & Technology Gymnasium — volleyball

Gumi
 Gumi Citizens' Stadium — football
 Park Chung Hee Gymnasium — basketball

Andong
 Andong Gymnasium — basketball

Gyeongju
 Sorabol College Gymnasium — basketball

Yeongcheon
 Yeongcheon Gymnasium — volleyball

Gyeongsan
 Kyungil University Gymnasium — volleyball
 Catholic University of Daegu Gymnasium — volleyball

Gimcheon
 Gimcheon Main Stadium — football

Sports
Events in a total of twelve sports were contested at this Universiade.
 Note: Numbers in brackets denote the number of different events held in each sport.

Obligatory sports

 Aquatics
 
 
 
 
 
 
 
 
 Artistic gymnastics (14)
 Rhythmic gymnastics (8)

Optional

Participants

 
 
 
 
 
 
 
 
 
 
 
 
 
 
 
 
 
 
 
 
 
 
 
 
 
 
 
 
 
 
 
 
 
 
 
 
 
 
 
 
 
 
 
 
 
 
 
 
 
 
 
 
 
 
 
 
 
 
 
 
 
 
 
 
 
 
 
 
 
 
 
 
 
 
 
 
 
 
 
 
 
 
 
 
 
 
 
 
 
  (host)

Medal table

External links
 Official website (archived)

 
2003
Universiade
Universiade
Sports competitions in Daegu
Universiade
Multi-sport events in South Korea
August 2003 sports events in Asia